This is a list of electoral divisions and wards in the ceremonial county of Shropshire in the West Midlands. All changes since the re-organisation of local government following the passing of the Local Government Act 1972 are shown. The number of councillors elected for each electoral division or ward is shown in brackets.

County council

Shropshire
Electoral Divisions from 1 April 1974 (first election 12 April 1973) to 7 May 1981:

Electoral Divisions from 7 May 1981 to 5 May 2005:

Electoral Divisions from 5 May 2005 to 4 June 2009:

Electoral Divisions from 4 June 2009 to present:

† minor boundary changes in 2013

Unitary authority council

Telford and Wrekin
Wards from 1 April 1974 (first election 7 June 1973) to 3 May 1979:

Wards from 3 May 1979 to 1 May 1997:

Wards from 1 May 1997 to 1 May 2003:

Wards from 1 May 2003 to 7 May 2015:

Wards from 7 May 2015 to present:

Former district councils

Bridgnorth
Wards from 1 April 1974 (first election 7 June 1973) to 3 May 1979:

Wards from 3 May 1979 to 1 May 2003:

Wards from 1 May 2003 to 1 April 2009 (district abolished):

North Shropshire
Wards from 1 April 1974 (first election 7 June 1973) to 6 May 1976:

Wards from 6 May 1976 to 1 May 2003:

Wards from 1 May 2003 to 1 April 2009 (district abolished):

Oswestry
Wards from 1 April 1974 (first election 7 June 1973) to 6 May 1976:

Wards from 6 May 1976 to 1 May 2003:

Wards from 1 May 2003 to 1 April 2009 (district abolished):

Shrewsbury and Atcham
Wards from 1 April 1974 (first election 7 June 1973) to 6 May 1976:

Wards from 6 May 1976 to 2 May 2002:

Wards from 2 May 2002 to 1 April 2009 (district abolished):

South Shropshire
Wards from 1 April 1974 (first election 7 June 1973) to 6 May 1976:

Wards from 6 May 1976 to 1 May 2003:

Wards from 1 May 2003 to 1 April 2009 (district abolished):

Electoral wards by constituency

Ludlow
Alveley and Claverley, Bishop's Castle, Bridgnorth East and Astley Abbotts, Bridgnorth West and Tasley, Broseley, Brown Clee, Church Stretton and Craven Arms, Clee, Cleobury Mortimer, Clun, Corvedale, Highley, Ludlow East, Ludlow North, Ludlow South, Much Wenlock, Worfield.

North Shropshire
Cheswardine, Ellesmere Urban, Gobowen, Selattyn and Weston Rhyn, Hodnet, Llanymynech, Market Drayton East, Market Drayton West, Oswestry East, Oswestry South, Oswestry West, Prees, Ruyton and Baschurch, Shawbury, St Martin's, St Oswald, The Meres, Wem, Whitchurch North, Whitchurch South, Whittington.

Shrewsbury and Atcham
Abbey, Bagley, Battlefield, Bayston Hill, Column and Sutton, Belle Vue, Bowbrook, Burnell, Castlefields and Ditherington, Chirbury and Worthen, Copthorne, Harlescott, Longden, Loton, Meole, Monkmoor, Porthill, Quarry and Coton Hill, Radbrook, Rea Valley, Severn Valley, Sundorne, Tern, Underdale.

Telford
Brookside, Cuckoo Oak, Dawley Magna, Horsehay and Lightmoor, Ironbridge Gorge, Ketley and Oakengates, Lawley and Overdale, Madeley, Malinslee, Priorslee, St Georges, The Nedge, Woodside, Wrockwardine Wood and Trench.

The Wrekin
Albrighton, Apley Castle, Arleston, Church Aston and Lilleshall, College, Donnington, Dothill, Edgmond, Ercall, Ercall Magna, Hadley and Leegomery, Haygate, Muxton, Newport East, Newport North, Newport South, Newport West, Park, Shifnal North, Shifnal South and Cosford, Shawbirch, Wrockwardine.

See also
Parliamentary constituencies in Shropshire

References

 
Shropshire